Adrian Pasdar (born April 30, 1965) is an American film, television, and voice actor. He is known for his roles in Profit, Near Dark, Carlito's Way, Mysterious Ways, Heroes and as Glenn Talbot on Agents of S.H.I.E.L.D.. Additionally, he directed the feature film Cement. He is also the voice of Iron Man in Marvel Anime, as well as in the animated series Ultimate Spider-Man and Avengers Assemble. He also played district attorney Alec Rybak on The Lying Game. He has appeared on the American TV drama Grand Hotel as Felix.

Early years
Pasdar was born in Pittsfield, Massachusetts. His father, Homayoon Pasdar (born 1935), was an Iranian immigrant who was a cardiac surgeon, with a practice near Philadelphia. His mother, Rosemarie Sbresny, worked as a travel agent. He graduated from Marple Newtown High School, where he played football and studied acting.

His sister, Anamarie Pasdar, is a theatrical artistic director and producer.

Career

Early career
Pasdar turned his attention to campus stage productions and rediscovered an early interest in writing and acting. No longer able to play football, he dropped out of school and returned home, taking a job with a theater group, People's Light and Theatre Company. There, he worked on sound and lighting as part of the stage crew responsible for set construction. He had a painful accident on the set, cutting off the end of his left thumb. His resulting medical compensation paid for attendance at the Lee Strasberg Theater Institute in New York City.

Pasdar was also selected to play a bit part as a police officer in the Dixie Chicks video for their song "Goodbye Earl". The music video won both the Academy of Country Music and the Country Music Association's Video of the Year Awards in 2000.

Film 
At the age of 19, he auditioned for a role in Top Gun. Director Tony Scott was so impressed that he wrote the part of "Chipper" just for him. This led to bigger roles in Solarbabies (1986), Streets of Gold (1986), and Kathryn Bigelow's cult vampire movie Near Dark (1987), with Pasdar in the lead role of Caleb Colton. His other major roles include Vital Signs (1990). Pasdar got his biggest break in movies, when he starred as a beautiful woman opposite Julie Walters in the British movie Just Like a Woman. In 1992, he left Hollywood and returned to New York, working as a cashier for room and board, while taking the occasional small part, such as Frankie in Brian De Palma's Carlito's Way (1993).

Adrian Pasdar wrote and directed the short film Beyond Belief and directed his first feature film, the art-house neo-noir Cement, a contemporary retelling of Othello, in 1999. The $1.7 million independent feature, which won Best Picture awards on the festival circuit, starred Chris Penn, Jeffrey Wright, Sherilyn Fenn, and Henry Czerny, and was written by Farscape screenwriter Justin Monjo. "I've used every ounce of energy and every drop of money I had to make Cement," Pasdar said.

Television 
Pasdar's major break into television came in 1996, when he was cast as the title character on the Fox series Profit. He also guest-starred in the two-hour season finale of the fourth season of Touched by an Angel. From 2000 to 2002, Pasdar played the lead role of anthropology Professor Declan Dunn in the spooky cult drama series Mysterious Ways on PAX.

Pasdar played David McClaren in the final two seasons of the CBS drama Judging Amy from 2003 through 2005.  In 2006, he had a high-profile guest role as Gabrielle Solis's sleazy lawyer in Desperate Housewives.

He starred as Nathan Petrelli in the NBC superhero drama Heroes. Pasdar based his mysterious character on "the most morally liquid characters" that he's encountered in his life. The character is not based on one particular political figure, but on a melange of different ones, both good and bad. Pasdar's character was killed off in an episode that aired November 30, 2009.

Pasdar voices Hawkeye in the animated series The Super Hero Squad Show and voiced Captain America in the Black Panther animated series. Having also voiced Iron Man in the English dub of the Iron Man anime series, Pasdar reprised the role in Marvel's Avengers Assemble (seasons 1–3), Ultimate Spider-Man, and Hulk and the Agents of S.M.A.S.H..

Pasdar also played a role on The Lying Game as Alec Rybak, a corrupt district attorney. From 2014 to 2018, he played the recurring role of Glenn Talbot on the Marvel TV series Agents of S.H.I.E.L.D., and from 2016 to 2017, recurred as Nolan Burgess on the series Colony. He also starred in the pilot of the Amazon Studios series The After. He also portrays the DC Comics character Morgan Edge in season 3 of The CW's Supergirl.

Personal life
Pasdar married musician Natalie Maines of the The Chicks on June 24, 2000.  They have two sons, born in 2001 and 2004. On July 5, 2017, Maines announced that she and Pasdar were divorcing after 17 years of marriage. The divorce was finalized on December 19, 2019. The divorce took over two years as Pasdar contested the validity of a pre-nuptial agreement and attempted to plead poverty to the court to obtain spousal support, despite reporting over $400,000 in income in 2018, according to court documents. Maines said that the Chicks' 2020 album Gaslighter includes songs with deeply personal themes, written during the divorce. The album surrounds the topic of a husband gaslighting and cheating on his wife, ending with the dissolution of the marriage.

Pasdar is a guitarist for charity rock band Band from TV. Part of the proceeds from the band's concerts go to his nominated charity, the Rush Epilepsy Center.

Awards and nominations
Acting

2009: Academy of Science Fiction, Fantasy & Horror Films: Saturn Award for Best Supporting Actor in Television, Heroes

Directing

2000: AngelCiti film festival: Audience Award, CementOther

2009 (ensemble): Hollywood Note Foundation's Change the World Awards, Humanitarian Award of Inspiration: Band From TVFilmography

Director

Audiobook narration
In 2010, Pasdar narrated an audiobook edition of the cult novel Queer Fish in God's Waiting Room by the British writer Lee Henshaw. It was released in early 2011.

Further reading

Bridget Byrne.  "Adrian Pasdar's television, film career working in Mysterious Ways"  Chicago Sun-Times''.  August 13, 2000.
 Adrienne Papp. "Heroes Among Us". Westside Today. Retrieved on May 5, 2008.

References

External links

 

1965 births
Living people
American male film actors
American male television actors
American male voice actors
American people of German descent
American people of Iranian descent
Lee Strasberg Theatre and Film Institute alumni
Male actors from Massachusetts
People from Pittsfield, Massachusetts
University of Florida alumni
20th-century American male actors
21st-century American male actors